Jari Bidda Jana is a 1980 Indian Kannada-language film, directed by Y. R. Swamy and produced by J. Chandulal Jain, B. Deepak Chand, Naveenchand Shah and A. Krishnamurthy. The film stars Lokesh, Jayanthi, Ashok and Rekha Rao. The film has musical score by T. G. Lingappa.

Cast

Lokesh
Jayanthi
Ashok
Rekha Rao
Srinivasa Murthy
Pramila Joshai
Thoogudeepa Srinivas
Musuri Krishnamurthy
Rajanand in Guest appearance
Uma Shivakumar in Guest appearance

Soundtrack
The music was composed by T. G. Lingappa.

References

External links
 

1980 films
1980s Kannada-language films
Films scored by T. G. Lingappa
Films directed by Y. R. Swamy